Javid Rahimi is an Afghan cricketer. He made his List A debut for Mis Ainak Region in the 2017 Ghazi Amanullah Khan Regional One Day Tournament on 10 August 2017. He made his first-class debut for Kunar Province in the 2018–19 Mirwais Nika Provincial 3-Day tournament on 15 February 2019.

References

External links
 

Year of birth missing (living people)
Living people
Afghan cricketers
Mis Ainak Knights cricketers
People from Nangarhar Province